Olga Panfyorova (born August 21, 1977) is a female race walker from Russia. She set the world's best year performance in the women's 10 km walk in 1998, clocking 42:01.00 in Izhevsk, Russia.

International competitions

References

1977 births
Living people
Russian female racewalkers
World Athletics Championships athletes for Russia
Russian Athletics Championships winners
20th-century Russian women